Stephan Crétier (born 8 August 1963) is a Canadian businessman and entrepreneur, and philanthropist. He is the founding president and chief executive officer of GardaWorld.
   
Crétier founded GardaWorld in 1995 with an investment of $25,000, which he raised by placing a second mortgage on his home. The company now generates over $5 billion in annual revenues and is one of the largest employers in the security industry, with 122 000 employees worldwide. Over the past 25 years, Crétier has pushed the expansion of his company into the security, risk management and cash services sectors, having grown the company organically and through acquisitions.

Recognized as Young Entrepreneur of the Year in 1998, Growth Leader by Profit 100 magazine for 11 consecutive years, and Great Entrepreneur of the Year in 2006, Crétier was named one of Canada's Entrepreneurs of the Decade by Profit Magazine in 2009 and recipient of the Queen Elizabeth II Diamond Jubilee Medal in 2012. He took the company private in a $1.1 billion transaction with support from private equity firm Apax Partners.

In July 2019, he led the largest buyout in Canadian history in a transaction worth $5.2bn with private equity firm BC Partners where Crétier now owns with selected management 49% of GardaWorld.

Philanthropy 
In 2006 he founded the Stéphan Crétier Foundation. In 2018 the foundation created the B.O.L.O Program  for offering financial incentives to the public for finding Canada's top 25 most wanted fugitives.

In November 2019, the Montreal Museum of Fine Arts unveiled the Stephan Crétier and Stéphany Maillery Wing for the Arts of One World.

References

1963 births
Living people
Canadian businesspeople